B36 Tórshavn kvinnur is the women's team of B36 Tórshavn, a Faroese football club based in Tórshavn and founded in 1936. The club participate in The Faroese Women's League  and plays in black and white. Their stadium, Gundadalur, has a capacity of 4,000. The women's section of B36 was created in 1985.

History

Women's football was officially established at The Faroes in 1985, after a trial year in 1984. B36 Tórshavn immediately established a women's section in the club, and gave it priority.  This paid off, and the club won the unofficial title in 1984, and the first official woman's national champions title in 1985. The following years women's football at The Faroes was dominated by teams from the capital. B36 Tórshavn took four national titles during this period, and the local rivals HB Tórshavn took seven.
 
In the new millennium, KÍ Klaksvík dominated women's football at The Faroes, by winning the title in 17 consecutive years, and taking the national Cup 14 times. This dominance lead to a fading interest in women's football elsewhere. The point of zero came in 2009, were none of the big club from the capital had a women's team in the Premier Division. A couple of years ago the dominance was broken, and the interest for women's football is increasing. This may also be based upon the recent success of the national women's team.

B36 Tórshavn has recently made a strategic decision that women's football will be equally treated in youth football, and that the best team will be given the same priority as the men's team. This is a long term strategy, were the goal is to develop home-grown players and prepare them for senior women's football. Therefore, there will be a couple of years before the best team again is ready to compete for the national title.

Current squad

Honours
1. deild kvinnur
Winners (4): 1985, 1987, 1996, 1998
Runners-up (10): 1988, 1994, 1995, 1999, 2001, 2002, 2004, 2005, 2007, 2012
2. deild kvinnur
Winners (3): 1991, 2010, 2012
Winners 1/2 vøll (2): 2009, 2011
Faroese Women's Cup
Winners (6): 1991, 1993, 1994, 1995, 1997, 2005
Runners-up (3): 1998, 2008, 2012

Honours Youth Academy
Faroe Isalnds Premier League U-18
Winners (4): 1993, 1994, 2000, 2002
Faroe Isalnds Cup U-18
Winners (2): 2018, 2019
Faroe Isalnds Premier League U-15
Winners (6): 1998, 2003, 2010, 2014, 2015, 2017
Faroe Isalnds Cup U-15
Winners (3): 2000, 2014, 2018
Faroe Isalnds Premier League U-13
Winners (1): 2001
Faroe Isalnds Premier League U-11
Winners (2): 1996, 2006

References

External links

Women's football clubs in the Faroe Islands
Sport in Tórshavn
Football clubs in Tórshavn